The ninth series of the Norwegian talent show Norske Talenter was broadcast in 2018.

Semifinal 1

Norske Talenter
2018 Norwegian television seasons